Sedij (also Romanized as Sedīj and Sadīj; also known as Sādaich, Sādeych, Sadīch, Sādovīj, and Sedīch) is a village in Surak Rural District, Lirdaf District, Jask County, Hormozgan Province, Iran. At the 2006 census, its population was 598, in 122 families.

References 

Populated places in Jask County